Hai'an Ji, often shortened as Hai'an, is a town-level region in Chenjiagang, Xiangshui County, Jiangsu, China.

Administrative divisions 
On July 3, 2001, Hai'an Ji  was merged into Chenjiagang  (:zh:陈家港镇). No change was made to location names.

Villager groups 
This list is incomplete.
 Hai'an 1st Group
 Hai'an 2nd Group
 Hai'an 3rd Group
 Hai'an 4th Group
 Hai'an 5th Group

Education 
 Hai'an Ji Central Elementary School
 Chenjiagang Xinmin Elementary School, previously Hai'an Ji Xiang Xinmin Elementary School
 Hai'an Ji Middle School

Notable places 
 Hai'an Fireworks Factory
  - a 50,000-tons grain storage spot located in Hai'an Ji.

See also 
 Chenjiagang Town
 2019 Xiangshui chemical plant explosion

References 

Chenjiagang
Township-level divisions of Jiangsu
Populated coastal places in China